Wilmcote railway station serves the village of Wilmcote, about  north of Stratford-upon-Avon in Warwickshire, England. The station is run by West Midlands Trains. It is served by both West Midlands Railway and Chiltern Railways trains.

History
The original single platform Wilmcote station opened in October 1860, on the Stratford-upon-Avon Railway's branch line from Hatton to Stratford.

The station was rebuilt slightly south of the original with two platforms in 1907, when the Great Western Railway doubled and upgraded this part of the branch line to main line standards, in order to incorporate it into the North Warwickshire Line, which created a new main line route between Birmingham and Cheltenham Spa.

Facilities
Wilmcote station is unstaffed. Tickets must be purchased from the senior conductor or train manager on the train.

Step free access is only available on the  bound platform.

Services

West Midlands Railway
Wilmcote is served by an hourly service, to  via  northbound and to  along the North Warwickshire Line.

On Sundays there is an hourly service to  via  and  northbound and to  southbound. Services only run between 09:30 and 19:45. A more expensive ticket is also available which allows travel via .

Chiltern Railways 

Sunday services only run from 09:40 with the final departure at 20:43.

Incidents 

On 24 March 1922, four track workers were killed after being hit by a light engine just south of the station. They were buried side-by-side in St Andrew's churchyard, Wilmcote, with a single headstone, which is extant, and individual grave marker stones. The incident became the subject of an in-depth academic study by the Railway Work, Life and Death project at Portsmouth University, leading up to its centenary. Edward Booker, the son of one of the victims, later served as Wilmcote's stationmaster. A commemorative event was held at the station, on the day of the centenary.

References

External links

Historical photographs at www.warwickshirerailways.com
Route of the North Warwickshire Line
Rail Around Birmingham and the West Midlands: Wilmcote station

 

Railway stations in Warwickshire
DfT Category F2 stations
Former Great Western Railway stations
Railway stations in Great Britain opened in 1860
Railway stations in Great Britain closed in 1907
Railway stations in Great Britain opened in 1907
Railway stations served by Chiltern Railways
Railway stations served by West Midlands Trains